Deinboll is a surname. Notable people with the surname include:

Peter Deinboll (1915–1944), Norwegian engineer and resistance member 
Rikka Deinboll (1897–1973), Norwegian librarian and translator
Tore Deinboll (1910–1988), Norwegian artist, cartoonist, and illustrator, stepson of Rikka